The 1961–62 NBA season was the Hawks' 13th season in the NBA and seventh season in St. Louis.

Regular season

Season standings

x – clinched playoff spot

Record vs. opponents

Game log

Awards and records
Bob Pettit, All-NBA First Team

References

Atlanta Hawks seasons
St. Louis
St. Louis Hawks
St. Louis Hawks